Glenn Ryan Hicks (born August 28, 1958) is a Canadian former professional ice hockey left winger. He played 69 games in the World Hockey Association with the Winnipeg Jets during the 1978–79 season and 108 games in the National Hockey League with the Detroit Red Wings during the 1979–80 and 1980–81 seasons. The rest of his career, which lasted from 1978 to 1986, was spent in the minor leagues. Glenn is the brother of Doug Hicks.

Career statistics

Regular season and playoffs

References

External links
 

1958 births
Living people
Adirondack Red Wings players
Birmingham South Stars players
Canadian ice hockey left wingers
EHC Kloten players
Flin Flon Bombers players
Ice hockey people from Alberta
Detroit Red Wings draft picks
Detroit Red Wings players
Salt Lake Golden Eagles (CHL) players
Salt Lake Golden Eagles (IHL) players
Sportspeople from Red Deer, Alberta
Springfield Indians players
Tulsa Oilers (1964–1984) players
Winnipeg Jets (WHA) players